Jack-Knife's I Wish You Would was a 1979 one-off recording project of John Wetton (lead vocals, bass guitar, keyboards), Richard Palmer-James (guitars), John Hutcheson (Hammond organ, piano, backing vocals) and Curt Cress (drums and percussion). Palmer-James had previously written lyrics for the band King Crimson, of which Wetton was a member.

It was released on E.G. Records 2302 094 (vinyl).

Track listing
Side One
  "I Wish You Would" - (Billy Boy Arnold) - 4:48
  "Good Morning Little Schoolgirl" - (Sonny Boy Williamson I) - 2:46
  "You Can't Judge a Book" - (Willie Dixon) - 3:28
  "Confessions" - (Richard Palmer-James) - 4:53
  "Eyesight to the Blind" - (Sonny Boy Williamson II) - 3:39
Side Two
  "Walk on Heaven's Ground" - (John Wetton, Richard Palmer-James) - 5:52
  "Dimples" - (James Bracken, John Lee Hooker) - 2:53
  "Mustang Momma" - (Richard Palmer-James) - 3:14
  "Adoration" - (John Wetton, Richard Palmer-James) - 6:16

Personnel
Jack-Knife
Richard Palmer-James – guitar
John Hutcheson – Hammond organ, piano, backing vocals
John Wetton – bass guitar, lead vocals, keyboards
Curt Cress – drums, percussion

Additional personnel
Peter Bischof – additional backing vocals
Michael Lohmann – saxophone
Kristian Schultze – Mini-Moog

References

External links

 Jack-Knife discography - RYM/Sonemic

1979 albums
Polydor Records albums

John Wetton albums